Sussex I State Prison is a prison of the Virginia Department of Corrections located in unincorporated Sussex County, Virginia, near Waverly.  It is adjacent to Sussex II State Prison, which lies to its northwest, just across Mussellwhite Drive.

The prison, a maximum security facility, opened in May 1998. It serves as an intake facility. It housed the state death row for men from the time it was moved from Mecklenburg Correctional Center in August, 1998 until the abolition of the death penalty in July, 2021. The actual execution chamber was at the Greensville Correctional Center.

References

External links

 "Sussex I State Prison." Virginia Department of Corrections.

Buildings and structures in Sussex County, Virginia
Prisons in Virginia
1998 establishments in Virginia